Quercus john-tuckeri is a North American species of oak known by the common name Tucker oak, or Tucker's oak. It is endemic to California, where it grows in the chaparral and oak woodlands of mountain slopes in the western Transverse Ranges, the southernmost Central Coast Ranges, and the margins of the Mojave Desert. The species is named after John M. Tucker, professor of botany (1947–1986) at the University of California at Davis, specialist in Quercus.

Description
The branches are gray or brown, the twigs coated in short woolly fibers when new and becoming scaly with age. The evergreen leaves are leathery and thick, sometimes brittle. They are gray-green, the lower surface slightly paler. The undersides are hairy, the upper surfaces somewhat less so.

See also
 Quercus × alvordiana

References

External links
 
 

john-tuckeri
Endemic flora of California
Natural history of the California chaparral and woodlands
Natural history of the California Coast Ranges
Natural history of the Mojave Desert
Natural history of the Santa Monica Mountains
Natural history of the Transverse Ranges
Plants described in 1952